The Tai Aiton are one among the six indigenous Tai communities of Assam. They are Animist and Buddhist by religion. The other indigenous Assamese communities commonly term them as Shyams or the people from Siam i.e. Thailand.  The names of their villages are directly translatable into modern Thai, as both sounds and meaning correspond.

They speak the Tai Aiton language, which is similar to other Tai languages spoken in Thailand.  They came to Assam far back in the 16th-17th century from the east crossing the Patkai hills. Presently they live in small pockets in Upper Assam along with the Turung and Khamyang people. Their population is unknown but is expected to be less than 8,000. They are Hinayana Buddhists and their language is close to that of North Eastern Thailand. They live in certain villages of Jorhat, Golaghat and Karbi Anglong districts. They have been recognized as Scheduled Tribes (Hills) and are listed as Man-Tai speaking people by the Government of Assam.

Man Tai Speaking people are not Ahom people as many may confuse them to be. 

Tai peoples
Tribes of Assam